Progressive muscle relaxation (PMR) is a non-pharmacological method of deep muscle relaxation, based on the premise that muscle tension is the body's psychological response to anxiety-provoking thoughts and that muscle relaxation blocks anxiety. 

The technique involves learning to monitor the tension in specific muscle groups by first tensing and then relaxing each muscle group. When this tension is released, the attention is directed towards the differences felt during tension and relaxation so that the patient learns to recognise the contrast between the states.

History

Initial development of PMR by American physician Edmund Jacobson and presented first in 1908 at Harvard University. 

In 1929, Jacobson published the book Progressive Relaxation, which included a detailed procedure for removing muscular tension. His work led to the use of the word "relax", in the sense of "to become less tense, anxious or stressed, to calm down". 

He continued to work on this topic throughout his life and wrote several books about it.

Applications

Insomnia

Nowadays, non-pharmacological treatment of insomnia has become an alternative replacement or complement to routine medical care. Progressive muscle relaxation is used as a treatment for some causes of insomnia. They are meant to reduce physical tension and interrupt the racing thoughts processes that affect sleep.
A common psychological problem of cancer patients and particularly for those in pain is insomnia.
Some studies reported benefits of the progressive muscle relaxation technique used by cancer patients. One of them postulated: "the significant effect for the muscle relaxation group on the sleep onset latency indicates that the subjects' self-reported insomnia was significantly improved. Total sleep time was increased as well".

Pain relief
Pain is one of the most frequent symptoms in patients undergoing surgery or cancer chemotherapy and various treatments are proposed for its relief, including relaxation techniques. Progressive muscle relaxation technique is suggested to lead to an increase in blood flow which supplies more oxygen, thus enhancing local metabolism, resulting in reduced pain and muscle spasms.

Progressive muscle relaxation might also reduce the perception of pain as well as providing pain relief by the patients after undergoing surgery. A recent study indicated "a significant tension decrease in all the types of muscles between pre- and post-relaxation situations for patients after surgery a result of progressive muscle relaxation".

It has also been indicated that the progressive muscle relaxation technique seems to show some positive achievements in the treatment of chronic pelvic pain in women. In the case of chronic pain it seems to not be possible to avoid the pain itself but rather to avoid the perceived threat (pain). Chronic pelvic pain is often associated with or resulting from the functions of the abdominal nervous system (often called "neuropathic pain"). If medications prescribed fail to be successful, patients may be referred to a practice specializing in a pain management, such as progressive muscle relaxation technique. Here, the treatment aims to release tightness of the muscles in the abdomen and lower back, as well as musculoskeletal tension.

Schizophrenia
Progressive muscle relaxation has been used in psychiatric settings as an alternative means of coping with subjective stress and states of anxiety. A few modern studies have reported a therapeutic effectiveness on psychological distress and anxiety symptoms as well as on response/remission for people with schizophrenia. There is some evidence revealing a decrease in stress level after regular training, after which patients tend to feel a greater sense of wellness and well-being. Moreover, they aim to learn how to manage stressful situations, especially those related to "self-control", "assuming responsibility" and "positive re-evaluation". However, the application of progressive muscle relaxation technique to the patients with schizophrenia is not widely used and the application requires additional research.

Sport
Professional sports require constant tension from athletes both physically and mentally, therefore it has been hypothesized that progressive muscle relaxation techniques may help athletes achieve optimal performance and optimize functioning in daily life.

Long term effects
According to Encyclopedia of medicine by Miller-Keane, long term effects of practicing progressive muscle relaxation include:
A decrease in generalized level of anxiety
A decrease in anticipatory anxiety related to phobias
Reduction in the frequency and duration of panic attacks
Improved ability to face phobic situations through graded exposure
Improved concentration
An increased sense of control over moods
Increased self-esteem
Increased spontaneity and creativity

See also 

 Autogenic training
 Autosuggestion
 Biofeedback
 Yoga nidra

References 

Body psychotherapy
Massage therapy